Earth Days is a 2009 documentary film about the history of the environmental movement in the United States, directed by Robert Stone and distributed by Zeitgeist Films in theaters.  Earth Days premiered at the 2009 Wisconsin Film Festival, and released to theatres on August 14, 2009.

Overview
Earth Days combines personal testimony and archival media. The film reviews the development of the modern environmental movement—from the post-war 1950s and the 1962 publication of Rachel Carson’s bestseller Silent Spring, to the  successful Earth Day celebration in 1970. Featured pioneers of the era include the former United States Secretary of the Interior Stewart Udall; biologist Paul Ehrlich, author of The Population Bomb; Whole Earth Catalog founder Stewart Brand; Apollo 9 astronaut Rusty Schweickart; "The Forecaster" Dennis Meadows, scientist and Emeritus Professor of Systems Management; and "The Politician" Pete McCloskey, former Republican. Also included are Richard Nixon, former Governor of California Jerry Brown, Jimmy Carter, Denis Hayes, Jacques-Yves Cousteau, and Hunter Lovins.

Release
The film premiered on April 2, 2009 at the Wisconsin Film Festival. It went on to have a limited theatrical release on August 14, 2009. It aired on US television on April 19, 2010 as part of the American Experience series on PBS.

Critical reception
On review aggregator website Rotten Tomatoes, the film holds an approval rating of 82% based on 33 reviews, and an average rating of 6.8/10. The website's critical consensus reads, "This engaging and well-organized eco-doc maps the successes and failures of the American environmental movement, thanks to sharp interviews and remarkable archive footage." On Metacritic, the film has a weighted average score of 70 out of 100, based on 13 critics, indicating "generally favorable reviews".

Awards and nominations
 Closing night film, 2009 Sundance Film Festival
 The Sheffield Green Award, 2009 Sheffield Doc/Fest
 Nominated – Writers Guild of America Award for Best Documentary Screenplay, 62nd Writers Guild of America Awards.

See also

 Environmentalism
 Radio Bikini (1988)
 Biophilia hypothesis
 Catching the Sun (2015)

References

External links
 
 
 
 Uprising Radio interview with Robert Stone

2009 films
2009 in the environment
American Experience
American documentary films
Documentary films about environmental issues
Environment of the United States
Environmental films
2009 documentary films
Films scored by Michael Giacchino
Films directed by Robert Stone
2000s English-language films
2000s American films